Comibaena punctaria is a moth of the family Geometridae first described by Charles Swinhoe in 1904. It is found on Madagascar.

The wingspan is 23 mm.

References

External links
 With images.

Moths described in 1904
Geometrinae
Lepidoptera of Madagascar
Moths of Madagascar
Moths of Africa